Rokowt is a village in the Wakhan, Badakhshan Province in north-eastern Afghanistan.  It lies on the Wakhan River between Qila-e Panja and Sarhad-e Broghil.

See also
Badakhshan Province

References

External links 
Satellite map at Maplandia.com 

Populated places in Badakhshan Province
Wakhan